Alex Clark may refer to:

 Alex Clark (baseball), American baseball player
 Alex Clark (journalist), British literary journalist
 Alex Clark (politician) (1916–1991), American politician
 Alex Clark (squash player) (born 1987), Scottish squash player

See also
 Alex Clarke (disambiguation)
Alexander Clark (disambiguation)